Murad Gerdi (born 7 March 1986) is a professional footballer who plays as a midfielder for Egg. Born in Austria, he played for the Iraq national team.

Career

In 2009, Gerdi signed for Yemeni side Al-Tilal.

Career statistics

Club

Notes

International

References

External links

1986 births
Living people
Iraqi footballers
Iraq international footballers
Austrian footballers
Austrian people of Iraqi descent
Association football midfielders
Austrian Regionalliga players
2. Liga (Austria) players
SC Austria Lustenau players
Al-Tilal SC players
Duhok SC players
Erbil SC players
Austrian expatriate footballers
Iraqi expatriate footballers
Iraqi expatriate sportspeople in Yemen
Expatriate footballers in Yemen